Lalchamliana is a Mizo National Front politician from Mizoram. He is the current home minister of Mizoram.

Career
He joined the Mizo National Front movement from 1966 to 1974 and held the rank of Lieutenant and then joined Pachhunga University College 1984 onward. He first contested as MLA in 1989 under the Mizoram People's Conference party unsuccessfully and thereafter was elected on Mizo National Front in 1998, 2003 and 2018. He was the 11th Speaker of Mizoram Legislative Assembly in 2003.

Education
He completed his MA in political science from North-Eastern Hill University in 1981, winning gold medal.

Personal life
He married Nuchhungi, and they have two sons and two daughters.

References 

1949 births
Living people
People from Aizawl
Speakers of the Mizoram Legislative Assembly
North-Eastern Hill University alumni
Mizo National Front politicians
Mizoram MLAs 2018–2023
Mizo people